Djidingar Dono Ngardoum (1928 – February 19, 2000) was Prime Minister of Chad from May 19, 1982 to June 19, 1982. He was minister of finance until 1965.

References

1928 births
2000 deaths
Heads of government of Chad
Finance ministers of Chad